The Province of Terni is the smaller of the two provinces in the Umbria region of Italy, comprising one-third of both the area and population of the region. Its capital is the city of Terni. The province came into being in 1927, when it was carved out of the original unitary province of Umbria.

The province of Terni has an area of 2,122 km², and a total population of 228,836 (2016).
There are 33 comunes in the province.

In June 2006, the only comunes with a population over 10,000 were Terni, Orvieto, Narni and Amelia.

Geography 
It is bordered to the north with the Province of Perugia, to the east, south and west with the Lazio (Province of Rieti and Province of Viterbo) and to north-west with the Tuscany (Province of Siena). The province extends into the south-west of the Umbria region, occupying the last section of the Nera River valley near the confluence with the Velino River, and the eastern part of the valley of the Tiber River.

The province of Terni is characterized by its slopes encountered along the path of rivers, allowing the exploitation of hydro catchment areas, so as to have led to the creation of several artificial lakes:

 Lake Corbara
 Lake Alviano
 Lake Recentino
 Lake San Liberato
 Lake Arezzo
 Lake Piediluco

History 
In the 2nd millennium BC the province was occupied by a population called Umbri, who founded the cities of Amelia, Narnia Nahars, Otricolum and Interamna Nahars. With the development of the Etruscan civilization, their territory was reduced to the valleys of the Black and Velino. One of the most important and richest Etruscan cities in Province of Terni was Orvieto and an unidentified place called Fanum Voltumnae. For centuries, Umbrian and Etruscan fought hard for the rule of the Tiber valley, until, in 299 BC when Roman legions began the invasion of Umbria.

The provincial territory was part of the Roman Republic and then the Roman Empire until the latter's western part fell in the 5th century AD. In 571 the Lombards, after invading the Po Plain, went down the Apennines and, in 575, founded the Duchy of Spoleto in what is now Umbria and the neighbouring areas; this state remained formally independent until 1250. In 1527 Terni was used a camp of the Landsknecht army that would subsequently take part in the Sack of Rome and fought at Spoleto and Todi, where the League of Cognac troops were located.

Before the late-19th century industrial development, Terni was a small center with some 15,000 inhabitants in 1881. In 1921 it had grown to 40,000 inhabitants. In 1926 it became the seat of a separate province, detached from Perugia, including the countryside around the main centres of Terni and Orvieto.

Image gallery

See also 
 Comuni of the Province of Terni

References

External links 
  

 
Terni
States and territories established in 1927